Saint-Vallier Basket Drôme, commonly known as SVBD, is a professional basketball club based in Saint-Vallier, France. The club was founded in 1993 and currently plays in the Pro B, the second tier of French basketball. Home games of the club are played at the Rives Sports Complex, which has capacity for 2,132 people.

Players

Notable players

 Malick Badiane

References

External links 
 Eurobasket.com Team Page

Basketball teams established in 1993
Basketball teams in France